The canton of Neste, Aure et Louron is an administrative division of the Hautes-Pyrénées department, southwestern France. It was created at the French canton reorganisation which came into effect in March 2015. Its seat is in Capvern.

It consists of the following communes:
 
Adervielle-Pouchergues
Ancizan
Aragnouet
Ardengost
Arreau
Aspin-Aure
Aulon
Avajan
Avezac-Prat-Lahitte
Azet
Bareilles
Barrancoueu
La Barthe-de-Neste
Bazus-Aure
Bazus-Neste
Beyrède-Jumet-Camous
Bordères-Louron
Bourisp
Cadéac
Cadeilhan-Trachère
Camparan
Capvern
Cazaux-Debat
Cazaux-Fréchet-Anéran-Camors
Ens
Escala
Esparros
Estarvielle
Estensan
Fréchet-Aure
Gazave
Génos
Germ
Gouaux
Grailhen
Grézian
Guchan
Guchen
Hèches
Ilhet
Izaux
Jézeau
Labastide
Laborde
Lançon
Lortet
Loudenvielle
Loudervielle
Mazouau
Mont
Montoussé
Pailhac
Ris
Sailhan
Saint-Arroman
Saint-Lary-Soulan
Sarrancolin
Tramezaïgues
Vielle-Aure
Vielle-Louron
Vignec

References

Cantons of Hautes-Pyrénées